Andreas Eudaemon-Joannis (1566–1625) was a Greek Jesuit, natural philosopher and controversialist. He was sometimes known as Cydonius.

Life
He entered the Society of Jesus in 1581, in Italy. He was at the Collegio Romano, where in 1597–8 he lectured on the Physics and other works of Aristotle; he wrote himself on projectile motion. He was at Padua from 1601, where he discussed the "ship's mast experiment" (see Galileo's ship) with Galileo Galilei. This meeting was before 1606.

Eudaemon-Joannis took a deathbed statement from Bellarmine in 1621. He became rector of the Greek College, Rome in 1622. He was theologian and advisor to Cardinal Francesco Barberini who went on a mission as legate to Paris in 1624/5. An unpopular insistence on the formalities was attributed to him, at a time of tension between the Jesuits and the French Catholic Church. He died in Rome, on 24 December 1625.

Works
He defended Robert Bellarmine, in particular, against English attacks over the allegiance oath of James I. One work was directed against Edward Coke, continuing a defence of Henry Garnet. The pamphlet war drew in Isaac Casaubon, and Eudaemon-Joannis was attacked by name by John Prideaux.

Eudaemon-Joannis was sometimes considered to be a pseudonym in this debate, for example for Scioppius; or for the French Jesuit Jean L'Heureux, something repeated in the Criminal Trials of David Jardine in the 19th century. A 1625 work, the Admonitio attacking Louis XIII, that appeared under the pseudonym G.G.R., has been attributed both to Eudaemon-Joannis and to Jacob Keller. Cardinal Richelieu believed Eudaemon-Joannis to be the author; Carolus Scribani was another suspect, and François Garasse was questioned, as part of the struggle of Gallicanism against the Jesuits.

Adversus Roberti Abb. Oxoniensis de Antichristo sophismata (1609)
Ad actionem proditoriam Edouardi Coqui, apologia pro R.P. Henrico Garneto (1610)
Confutatio Anti-Cotoni (1611)
Parallelus Torti ac Tortoris (1611), against Lancelot Andrewes on behalf of Bellarmine.
Castigatio Apocalypsis apocalypeos Th. Breghtmanni (1611); against Thomas Brightman.
Responsio ad epistolam Isaaci Casauboni; attack on Casaubon and reply to his letter to Fronto Ducaeus. It alleged Casaubon wrote on behalf of James I for money.
Epistola monitoria, ad Ioannem Barclaium (1613); against John Barclay, who had written in defence of his father William Barclay's De potestate papae.
Epistola ad amicum Gallum super dissertatione politica Leidhresseri (1613); a reply to Desiderius Heraldus (Didier Hérault or Hérauld) writing as David Leidhresserus.
Refutatio exercitationum Isaaci Casauboni libris duobus comprehensa (1617)
Defensio annalium ecclesiasticorum Caesaris Baronii (1617)
Admonitio ad lectores librorum M. Antonii de dominis (1619)
Excerpta ex litteris de pio obitu Rob. cardinalis Bellarmini (1621)

Notes

External links
WorldCat page
CERL page
Andreas Eudaemon-Joannes in the Historical Archives of the Pontifical Gregorian University

1566 births
1625 deaths
Greek Jesuits
People from Chania